The Leiden – Sarin International Air Law Moot Court Competition is an international moot competition organised by Leiden University. It was started in 2010 by the university's International Institute of Air and Space Law and by India's Sarin Memorial Legal-Aid Foundation, the legal aid arm of Sarin & Co. The mock aviation law proceedings are before the International Court of Justice. The international rounds of the competition comprise a mix of teams that proceed directly and teams that have qualified from the national rounds. Two preliminary rounds are held to determine the best applicant and respondent sides, who would then face off in the championship final. Due to the pandemic, the 2020 edition only awarded memorial prizes, while the 2021 edition was held online.

References

Moot court competitions